Barrosa (or Barossa, or Barosa, or Barrossa) was launched at Nantes in 1810 under another name. She was purchased in 1811 as a prize, renamed, and her new owners sailed her as a West Indiaman. A French privateer captured and released her, and a year later an American privateer captured her but the Royal Navy recaptured her.

Career
Barosa first appeared in Lloyd's Register (LR) with J.Burry, master, Carr & Co., owners, and trade Cork–Jamaica.

Capture and release: Barossa, Barry, master, arrived at Jamaica on 23 July 1811. Duc de Dantzig, of 10 guns and 176 men, had plundered Barossa and thrown her guns overboard, and had then let her proceed.

Capture and recapture: The American privateer  captured Barrossa, Kellicker, master, and Apollo, in 1813 near Teneriffe. Barrossa was sailing from Cork to Jamaica. Apollo, of and from London, was sailing to New Providence. Rolla landed the crews at Tenerife.

The Royal Navy recaptured Barrosa, Kellekher, master, and Eliza, Gibson, master, from Bristol and Madeira to Jamaica, both prizes to Rolla, and sent them into Bermuda.

Barrosa was last listed in the Register of Shipping in 1819, but with stale data.

Notes

Citations

1810 ships
Ships built in France
Captured ships
Age of Sail merchant ships of England